Le Stade is a railway station in Colombes, Hauts-de-Seine department, in the northwestern suburbs of Paris, France.

History
The station was opened in 1924 to serve the Stade Olympique Yves-du-Manoir for the Summer Olympic Games.

Line serving this station
 SNCF Gare Saint-Lazare (Banlieue)–Ermont–Eaubonne (Terminus)

See also
 List of stations of the Paris RER

External links
 

Railway stations in Hauts-de-Seine
Railway stations in France opened in 1924
1924 Summer Olympics